Eva Baltasar (born August 26, 1978) is a Spanish poet and writer. She has a bachelor's degree in Pedagogy from the University of Barcelona. She has published ten books of poetry, which have earned numerous awards including the 2008 Miquel de Palol, the 2010 Benet Ribas, and the 2015 Gabriel Ferrater. Baltasar's first novel, Permafrost, received the 2018 Catalan Booksellers Award and it has sold the translation rights to six languages.

Literary work

Novel
 Permagel. Club Editor, 2018
Boulder. Club Editor, 2020
Mamut. Club Editor, 2022

Translated Work

 Permafrost. Penguin Random House, 2018 (Spanish)
 Permafrost. Nottetempo, 2019 (Italian)
 Boulder. Penguin Random House, 2020 (Spanish)

Poetry
 Laia. Columna, 2008
 Atàviques feres. Cossetània Edicions, 2009
 Reclam. Institut d'Estudis Ilerdencs, 2010
 Dotze treballs. Pagès, 2011
 Medi aquàtic. Pagès, 2011
 Poemes d'una embarassada. Pagès, 2012
 Vida limitada. Món de Llibres, 2013
 Animals d'hivern. Edicions 62, 2016
 Neutre. Bromera, 2017
 Invertida. Lleonard Muntaner, 2017
 Nus Schiele. Club Editor, 2021

Awards

 2008 Miquel de Palol Prize for Laia
 2008 Ramon Comas i Maduell Prize for Atàviques feres
 2010 Benet Ribas Prize for Dotze treballs
 2010 Les Talúries Prize for Reclam
 2010 Màrius Torres Prize for Medi aquàtic
 2011 Jordi Pàmias Prize for Poemes d'una embarassada
 2013 Miquel Àngel Riera Prize for Vida limitada
 2015 Gabriel Ferrater Prize for Animals d'hivern
 2016 Mallorca Prize for Invertida
 2016 Ibn Jafadja Prize for Neutre
 2018 Llibreter Award for Permagel
 2018 L'illa dels llibres Award for Permagel
 2019 Premi Continuarà de Cultura Rtve 2019

References 

 

1978 births
Living people
Poets from Catalonia